Christian Palestinian Aramaic (CPA) was a Western Aramaic dialect used by the Melkite Christian community in Palestine and Transjordan between the fifth and thirteenth centuries. It is preserved in inscriptions, manuscripts (mostly palimpsests, less papyri in the first period) and amulets. All the medieval Western Aramaic dialects are defined by religious community. CPA is closely related to its counterparts, Jewish Palestinian Aramaic (JPA) and Samaritan Aramaic (SA). CPA shows a specific vocabulary that is often not paralleled in the adjacent Western Aramaic dialects.

Name
No source gives CPA a name as a distinct dialect or language and all such names are modern scholarly inventions. Names like "Palestinian Syriac" and "Syropalestinian Aramaic" reflect the fact that Palestinian Aramaic speakers often referred to their language as Syriac and made use of an alphabet based on the northern Syriac ʾEsṭrangēlā script. Egeria, in the account of her pilgrimage to Palestine at the end of the 4th century, refers to Syriac, which was probably what is now Christian Palestinian Aramaic.

The term syrica Hierosolymitana was introduced by J. D. Michaelis based on the appearance of the Arabic name of Jerusalem, al-Quds, in the colophon of a Gospel lectionary of 1030 AD (today Vat. sir. 19). It was also used in the first edition by Miniscalchi Erizzo. The term "Jerusalem Syriac" is sometimes said to emphasise the location where most of the first inscriptions were found, although most of them come today from Transjordan.

The terms "Christian Palestinian Aramaic" and "Melkite Aramaic" emphasise the confessional identity of the speakers and the distinctness from any Syriac variety of Aramaic.

History
CPA is preserved in inscriptions, manuscripts (mostly palimpsests in the early period) and amulets. The history of CPA writing can be divided into three periods: early (5th–7th/8th centuries), middle (8th–9th) and late (10th–13th). The existence of a middle period has only recently come to light.

Only inscriptions, fragmentary manuscripts and the underwriting of palimpsests survive from the early period. Of the inscriptions, only one can be dated with any precision. The fragments are both Biblical and Patristic. The oldest complete (non-fragmentary) manuscript dates to 1030. All the complete manuscripts are liturgical in nature.

CPA declined as a spoken language because of persecution and gradual Arabization following the early Islamic conquests. From the tenth century onwards it was mainly a liturgical language in the Melkite churches and the Melkite community mainly spoke Arabic. Even as a written language, it went extinct around the fourteenth century and was only identified or rediscovered as a distinct variety of Aramaic in the nineteenth century.

Corpus

The only surviving original compositions in CPA are inscriptions in mosaics and rock caves (lavras), magical silver amulets and a single short magical booklet. All other surviving manuscript compositions are translations of Greek originals.

Many of the palimpsests come from Saint Catherine's Monastery in Sinai (e.g., the Codex Climaci Rescriptus), but some also from Mar Saba (e.g., part of the Codex Sinaiticus Rescriptus), the Cairo Genizah and the Umayyad Mosque in Damascus. They often transmit rare texts lost in the Greek transmission (e.g. the Transitus Mariae; the hitherto unknown martyrdom of Patriklos of Caesarea, one of the eleven followers of Pamphilus of Caesarea; and a missing quire of Codex Climaci Rescriptus), or offer valuable readings for the textual criticism of the Septuagint.

Inscriptions have been found in Palestine at ʿEn Suweinit, near ʿAbūd, at ʿUmm er-Rūs, in the Church of Saint Anne in Jerusalem, at Hippos in Galilee, and at Khirbet Qastra near Haifa. In Transjordan, inscriptions have been found on Mount Nebo (ʿAyūn Mūsa), in the vicinity of Amman (Khayyān el-Mushrif) and on tomb stones in Khirbet es-Samra.

The manuscripts include a short letter on papyrus from Khibert Mird and at least one wooden board. The parchment manuscript fragments are Biblical (mostly in the form of lectionaries), Patristic, theological (e.g. the catecheses by Cyril of Jerusalem and homilies by John Chrysostom), hagiographic (mostly martyrs' lives) or apocryphal (e.g., the Transitus Mariae). The only dated manuscript is the Gospel lectionary of 1030.

Features
CPA can be distinguished from JPA and SA by the lack of direct influence from Hebrew and new Hebrew loanwords, its Hebrew loanwords being retained from an earlier symbiosis of Hebrew and Aramaic. It is also distinguished by the presence of Greek syntax (by partial retention in translation). Also, unlike JPA and SA, CPA is attested only in primary texts (mostly in palimpsests). There was no transmission of manuscripts after the language itself went out use as liturgical language. In comparison with its counterparts, therefore, the CPA corpus represents an older, more intact example of Western Aramaic from when the dialects were still living, spoken languages.

Editions of texts

Manuscripts
 Jan P. N. Land, Anecdota Syriaca IV (Leiden, 1875), pp. 177–233 [Latin], pp. 103–224 [Syropalestinian], pls. I–VI.
 James Rendall Harris, Biblical Fragments from Mount Sinai (Cambridge, 1890), pp. 65–68.
 Paul de Lagarde, Evangeliarum Hierosolymitanum (Bibliothecae syriacae; Göttingen, 1892), pp. 257–402.
 George H. Gwilliam, The Palestinian Version of the Holy Scriptures (Anecdota Oxoniensia, Semitic Series Vol. I Part V; Oxford, 1893).
 George H. Gwilliam, Francis Crawford Burkitt, John F. Stenning, Biblical and Patristic Relics of the Palestinian Syriac Literature, (Anecdota Oxoniensia, Semitic Series Vol. I, Part IX; Oxford, 1896).
 G. Margoliouth, The Liturgy of the Nile, Journal of the Royal Asiatic Society 1896, pp. 677–727, pls. I–II.
 Agnes S. Lewis and Margaret D. Gibson, The Palestinian Syriac Lectionary of the Gospels (London, 1899).
 Agnes S. Lewis and Margaret D. Gibson, Palestinian Syriac Texts from Palimpsest Fragments in the Taylor-Schechter Collection (London, 1900).
 Agnes S. Lewis and Margaret D. Gibson, An Appendix of Palestinian Syriac Texts (Studia Sinaitica XI; London, 1902), pp. XXVIII–XXIX, XLVII.
 Friedrich Schulthess, Christlich-palästinische Fragmente, Zeitschrift der Deutschen Morgenländischen Gesellschaft 56, 1902, pp. 249–261.
 Friedrich Schulthess, Christlich-palästinische Fragmente aus der Omajjaden-Moschee zu Damaskus (Berlin, 1905).
 Pavel K. Kokowzoff, Nouveaux fragments syropalestiniens de la Bibliothèque Impériale Publique de Saint-Pétersbourg (St. Petersburg, 1906).
 Hugo Duensing, Christlich-palästinisch-aramäische Texte und Fragmente (Göttingen, 1906).
 Agnes S. Lewis, A Palestinian Syriac Lectionary: Containing Lessons from the Pentateuch, Job, Proverbs, Prophets, Acts, and Epistles (Cambridge, 1897).
 Agnes S. Lewis, Supplement to a Palestinian Syriac Lectionary (Cambridge, 1907).
 Agnes S. Lewis, Codex Climaci Rescriptus (Horae Semiticae VIII; Cambridge, 1909).
 Agnes S. Lewis, The Forty Martyrs of the Sinai Desert and the Story of Eulogios (Horae Semiticae IX; Cambridge, 1912).
 Matthew Black, Rituale Melchitarum. A Christian Palestinian Euchologion (Stuttgart, 1938).
 Matthew Black, "A Palestinian Syriac Palimpsest Leaf of Acts XXI (14–26)," Bulletin of the John Rylands Library 23, 1939, pp. 201–214, pls. 1–2.
 N. Pigoulewski, "Fragments syro-palestiniens des Psaumes CXXIII–IV," Revue Bibilque 43 (1934), pp. 519–527, pl. XXX.
 Hugo Duensing, Neue christlich-palästinische-aramäische Fragmente, NAWG, phil.-hist. Kl. 9 (Göttingen, 1944).
 Matthew Black, A Christian Palestinian Syriac Horologion (Texts and Studies N.S. 1; Cambridge, 1954).
 Hugo Duensing, Nachlese christlich-palästinisch aramäischer Fragmente, NAWG, phil.-hist. Kl. 5 (Göttingen, 1955).
 Charles Perrot, "Un fragment christo-palestinien découvert à Khirbet Mird," Revue Biblique 70, 1963, pp. 506–555, pls. XVIII–XXIX.
 Moshe Goshen-Gottstein with the Assistance by H. Shirun (ed.), The Bible in the Syropalestinian Version. Part I. Pentateuch and Prophets (Publications of the Hebrew University Bible Project Monograph Series; Jerusalem, 1973).
 Christa Müller-Kessler and Michael Sokoloff, The Christian Palestinian Aramaic Old Testament and Apocrypha (Corpus of Christian Palestinian Aramaic I; Groningen, 1997). 
 Maurice Baillet, "Un livret magique en christo-palestinien à l’Université de Louvain," Le Muséon 76, 1963, pp. 375–401.
 Sebastian P. Brock, A Fragment of the Acta Pilati in Christian Palestinian Aramaic, Journal of Theological Studies N.S. 22, 1971, pp. 157–158.
 Sebastian P. Brock,  Catalogue of the New Finds (Athens, 1995).
 Alain Desreumaux, Codex sinaiticus Zosimi rescriptus (Histoire du Texte Biblique 3; Lausanne, 1997). 
 Alain Desreumaux, "Une inscription araméenne melkite sous une peinture copte du musée du Louvre. Le texte araméen melkite," Oriens Christianus 86, 1996, pp. 82–97. 
 Christa Müller-Kessler and Michael Sokoloff, The Christian Palestinian Aramaic New Testament Version from the Early Period. Gospels (Corpus of Christian Palestinian Aramaic IIA; Groningen, 1998). 
 Christa Müller-Kessler and Michael Sokoloff, The Christian Palestinian Aramaic New Testament Version from the Early Period. Acts of the Apostles and Epistles (Corpus of Christian Palestinian Aramaic IIB; Groningen, 1998). 
 Sebastian P. Brock, Fragments of PS-John Chrysostom, Homily on the Prodigal Son, in Christian Palestinian Aramaic, Le Muséon 112, 1999, pp. 335–362.
 Christa Müller-Kessler and Michael Sokoloff, The Catechism of Cyril of Jerusalem in the Christian Palestinian Aramaic Version (A Corpus of Christian Palestinian Aramaic V; Groningen, 1999). 
 Christa Müller-Kessler, Codex Sinaiticus Rescriptus. A Collection of Christian Palestinian Aramaic Manuscripts, Le Muséon 127, 2014, pp. 263–309.
 Alin Suciu, "An Addition to Christian Palestinian Aramaic Literary Corpus: Logos XV of Abba Isaiah of Scetis," Journal of Semitic Studies 61, 2016, pp. 449–461.
 Christa Müller-Kessler, "Three Early Witnesses of the «Dormition of Mary» in Christian Palestinian Aramaic: Palimpsests from the Cairo Genizah (Taylor-Schechter Collection) and the New Finds in St Catherine's Monastery," Apocrypha 29 (2018), pp. 69–95.
 Laurent Capron, Deux fragments d’épittres pauliniennes (1 Thess. et 1 Cor.) en araméen christopalestinien, Semitica 61, 2019, 117–127.
 Christa Müller-Kessler, "An Overlooked Christian Palestinian Aramaic Witness of the Dormition of Mary in Codex Climaci Rescriptus (CCR IV)," Collectanea Christiana Orientalia 16, 2019, pp. 81–98.
 C. Müller-Kessler, "The Unknown Martyrdom of Patriklos of Caesarea in Christian Palestinian Aramaic from St Catherine's Monastery (Sinai, Arabic NF 66)," Analecta Bollandiana 137, 2019, pp. 63–71.

Inscriptions
 M. Halloun and R. Rubin, "Palestinian Syriac Inscription from ‘En Suweinit," Liber Annuus 31, 1981, pp. 291–298, pls. 59–62.

Notes

References

Further reading

 
 
 
 
 
 
 
 Sebastian P. Brock, "Ktabe mpassqe: Dismembered and Reconstructed Syriac and Christian Palestinian Aramaic Manuscripts: Some Examples, Ancient and Modern", Hugoye, Journal of Syriac Studies 15 (2012), pp. 7–20. 
 
 
 
 
 
 Philothée du Sinaï, Nouveaux manuscrits syriaques du Sinai (Athens, 2008).
 Émile Puech, "Notes d’épigraphie christo-palestinienne de Jordanie", in Memoriam: Fr Michele Piccirillo, ofm (1944–2008) ed. by Claudine Dauphin and Basema Hamarneh, BAR International Series'' 248 (Oxford, 2011), pp. 75–94. 
 

Western Aramaic languages
Extinct languages of Asia
History of Palestine (region)
Palimpsests